The social season, or season, refers to the traditional annual period in the spring and summer when it is customary for members of the social elite of British society to hold balls, dinner parties and charity events. Until the First World War, it was also the appropriate time to be resident in the city (generally meaning London) rather than in the country in order to attend such events.

In modern times in the United Kingdom, "the Season" is known to encompass various prestigious events that take place during the spring and summer. According to The Sloaney magazine's online guide "Sloaney Season", it starts with Cheltenham Festival (March), and includes the Grand National (April), The Boat Race (April), Badminton Horse Trials (May), Chelsea Flower Show (May), Epsom Derby (June), Royal Ascot (June), Test matches at Lord's (July), Wimbledon (July), Henley Royal Regatta (July), Edinburgh International Festival (August) and others, ending with Goodwood Revival (September).

Social season of London

The London social season evolved in the 17th and 18th centuries, and in its traditional form it peaked in the 19th century. In this era the British elite was dominated by families of the nobility and landed gentry, who generally regarded their country house as their main home, but spent several months of the year in the capital to socialise and to engage in politics. The most exclusive events were held at the town mansions of leading members of the aristocracy. Exclusive public venues such as Almack's played a secondary role. The Season coincided with the sitting of parliament; it began some time after Christmas and ran until midsummer, roughly late June.

The social season played a role in the political life of the country: the members of the two Houses of Parliament were almost all participants in the season. But the Season also provided an opportunity for the children of marriageable age of the nobility and gentry to be launched into society. Debutantes were formally introduced into society by presentation to the monarch at royal court during the Court Drawing Rooms and Queen Charlotte's Ball until the practice was abolished by Queen Elizabeth II in 1958. Queen Charlotte's Ball ceased to function in 1976, but has been relaunched since, by former debutante Jennie Hallam-Peel, without the monarch's involvement, and with more limited uptake; debutantes instead curtsy to "Queen Charlotte's Birthday Cake".

The traditional Season went into decline after the First World War, when many aristocratic families gave up their London mansions. From then on, more society events took place at public venues, making it harder to maintain social exclusivity.

Many events that take place far from central London (though generally within the Home Counties) came to be regarded as part of the social season, including Royal Ascot and the Henley Royal Regatta. The events that now constitute the London social season are increasingly hosted or sponsored by large companies (i.e. "corporate hospitality"). Western dress codes still apply to certain events in the season, especially those in which the King maintains an official role.

According to the peerage guide Debrett's, the traditional social season runs from April to August.

Arts
 Glyndebourne Opera Festival
 The Proms
 Royal Academy Summer Exhibition
 West End theatre

Horticulture
 Chelsea Flower Show

Equestrianism
 Royal Ascot
 Cheltenham Gold Cup
 Badminton Horse Trials
 Grand National
 Royal Windsor Horse Show
 Epsom Derby
 Glorious Goodwood
 Cartier Queen's Cup

The Crown
 Trooping the Colour
 Garter Service of the Order of the Garter
 Royal Edinburgh Military Tattoo

Sport
 Boat Race
 Henley Royal Regatta
 Guards Polo Club
 The Championships, Wimbledon
 Cowes Week
 Lord's Test cricket match

Although several of these events are not actually held in London, such as the Hurlingham Polo Association at Guards Polo Club, the organisers of most events attempt to avoid date clashes, so it is generally possible to visit all of them in the same year.

The traditional end of the London Season is the Glorious Twelfth of August, which marks the beginning of the shooting season. Society would retire to the country to shoot birds during the autumn and hunt foxes during the winter before coming back to London again with the spring.

Dress codes
Many events of the season have traditional expectations with regard to Western dress codes.
 At Royal Ascot, for example, hats are compulsory in most enclosures, and to be admitted to the Royal Enclosure for the first time one must either be a guest of a member or be sponsored for membership by two members who have attended for at least six years as a member. This continues to maintain a socially exclusive character for the Royal Enclosure. Gentlemen are required to wear either black or grey morning dress with waistcoat and a top hat. A gentleman must remove his top hat within a restaurant, a private box, a private club or that facility's terrace, balcony or garden. Hats may also be removed within any enclosed external seating area within the Royal Enclosure Garden. Ladies must not show bare midriffs or shoulders and must wear hats. In the Queen Anne Enclosure (formerly known as the Grandstand), gentlemen are required to wear lounge suits with ties and ladies must wear a hat.
 At Henley Royal Regatta, in the Stewards' Enclosure gentlemen must wear a lounge jacket and tie. Rowing club colours on a blazer or cap are encouraged, as is the wearing of boaters. A lady's skirt hem must reach below the knee and is checked before entry by the Stewards' Officers. Both ladies and gentlemen will be turned away if they fail to comply with the dress code, regardless of their prestige in rowing or elsewhere. Hats are encouraged but not required for ladies. When a student protested being denied entry to the Stewards' Enclosure for failing to meet the dress code, saying she had worn the dress "in the Royal Enclosure at Ascot and nobody said anything", a spokesman defended the dress code, saying "The intention is to maintain the atmosphere of an English Garden party of the Edwardian period by wearing a more traditional dress." Members must display their enamel badges at all times. Anyone found using a mobile phone is asked to leave immediately and their Stewards' Enclosure host, identified by the number on the guest's badge, may have his membership withdrawn as a result.
 At polo matches, it is usual for gentlemen to wear a blazer and always white trousers. Ladies should wear flat shoes, as the tradition of "treading in the divots" (pressing back into place the clods of turf thrown up by the horses’ hooves) precludes wearing heels. The famous Club House at Guards Polo Club in Windsor Great Park is for the use of club members only, who wear individually made gold and enamel badges. Members' guests are given special gold-embossed tags.

In popular culture
 A London Season features in Jane Austen's Sense and Sensibility and is often a key plot device in Regency romance novels.
 The 1927 novel Lucia in London by E. F. Benson is set during the London season in the 1920s.
 The 1938 novel Death in a White Tie by Ngaio Marsh is set during the London season.
 Eliza Doolittle's first public tryout and debut into high society in My Fair Lady, the musical film version of George Bernard Shaw’s book Pygmalion, uses the idea of Ascot Racecourse as a setting.
 The novel The Leopard by Giuseppe Tomasi di Lampedusa, and the 1963 film of the same name by Luchino Visconti, portray the Palermitan season during the Risorgimento.
 The events of Julian Fellowes's novel Past Imperfect take place during the 1968 season in London.
 In the 2003 film What a Girl Wants, Lord Henry Dashwood invites his new-found daughter Daphne to attend the London Season.
 The 2009 young-adult novel The Season by Sarah MacLean portrays a young woman entering her first London Season.
 Vincente Minnelli's The Reluctant Debutante
 In the British period drama Downton Abbey the outspoken youngest daughter of the fictional Earl of Grantham, Lady Sybil, is presented as a debutante at court in London during her first season. The family are also portrayed to move to London for the duration of the season, returning to their country seat at the end of it. The show's 2013 Christmas Special (set in the summer of 1923) focuses on cousin Lady Rose McClare's debutante ball and presentation at court.
 Oscar Wilde's novel The Picture of Dorian Gray; and his plays Lady Windermere's Fan, An Ideal Husband and The Importance of Being Earnest.
 In Michel Faber's The Crimson Petal and the White, the Season is part and parcel of the plot.
 The Malory-Anderson Family Saga series of historical romance novels by Johanna Lindsey is set primarily in London, the first one opening in 1817. Throughout the series, one Season or another and the balls thrown during them, are mentioned in dialogue and are sometimes central to the plot lines themselves.
 Honoré de Balzac's novel The Muse of the Department contains a description of the London Season:
London is the capital of shops and of speculation, the government is made there. The aristocracy inscribes itself there only during sixty days, it there takes its orders, it inspects the government kitchen, it passes in review its daughters to marry, and equipages to sell, it says good-day and goes away promptly ; - it is so little amusing that it supports itself only for the few days called the season.
 Most of the Regency Romance novels by Georgette Heyer feature the London Season.
 The Royal Ascot racecourse was used as a filming location in the James Bond film A View to a Kill (1985), in which Bond was beginning his mission to defeat the villainous Max Zorin, whose horse was racing there.
 The events depicted in the Netflix period drama series Bridgerton take place during the London Season.  Julia Quinn’s Bridgerton novels, on which the Netflix series is based, also primarily take place in London during the Season.

Notes

External links
 The London Season by Michelle Jean Hoppe
 Late Victorian/Edwardian London Season
 Gilded Age New York social season

British culture
Cultural history of the United Kingdom
Social history of the United Kingdom
Regency London
Society
European court festivities
High society (social class)
Debutantes